DeWitt Clinton Park is a  New York City public park in the Hell's Kitchen neighborhood of Manhattan, New York City, between West 52nd and 54th Streets, and Eleventh and Twelfth Avenues.

The park, which was one of the first New York City parks in Manhattan on the working waterfront of the Hudson River, is named for DeWitt Clinton, who had created a business boom of Hudson commerce when he opened the Erie Canal. It is the biggest city park in the neighborhood, and since 1959, the neighborhood has frequently been referred to as "Clinton".  It is the only park on the west side of Manhattan to have lighted ball fields.

The park was the first community garden in New York City.

History

Site
The land for the park was part of the Striker and Hopper homestead farms which had been in those families for more than 200 years.  The home of General Garrit Hopper Striker built in 1752 had been torn down in 1895.  Another farmhouse called the Mott farmhouse built in 1796 on 54th Street was torn down in 1896.  The city announced plans to purchase the land (called "Sriker's Lane") in 1896. Other buildings on the site were torn down in 1902 and a tent was placed on the site in 1903.  In 1906 the hilly terrain was graded at a cost of $200,000.  At the same time, the De Witt Clinton High School opened nearby on Tenth Avenue.

The park's original 1901 design by Samuel Parsons Jr. encompassed a bigger park that was much less developed than the current park. Since Navy requirements set length limits on piers, the city was able to lengthen the piers by removing land from Manhattan so that longer piers could be built that would not extend beyond the Navy limits. The park was originally   and stretched nearly to the Hudson River, and it featured a recreation/bathing pavilion, gymnasium, running track, playgrounds, and a series of curving paths with viewing desks of the Hudson River and the Palisades. The park's centerpiece was a children's farm garden, which operated from 1902 to 1932. The farm, which was the first of its kind in New York City, was championed by Frances Griscom Parsons (no relation to the landscaper Samuel Parsons). It featured flower beds, observation plots, a pergola, and 356 4' × 8' vegetable gardens each assigned to a "little farmer".

Parsons himself also described the park:

Development and decline
In 1930 a sculpture Flanders Field Memorial featuring a doughboy by Burt Johnson, a brother-in-law of Augustus Saint-Gaudens, was dedicated in the park. Johnson also designed a similar statue in Doughboy Park in Woodside, Queens. The removed earth was transported to Central Park where it was used to fill in the Lower Reservoir for what would become the park's Great Lawn. The park's unobstructed views of the Hudson were further diminished with the construction in 1935 of the New York Passenger Ship Terminal. The park's unobstructed views of the Hudson River and New Jersey Palisades have been affected by the construction of the New York Passenger Terminal (although a sidewalk along a sycamore lined curved path on the west side is a popular vantage point for viewing cruise ships at the terminal). The children's garden was removed in 1932. The undulating lawn, music stands, and lengthy arbor have been removed. In their place is a fenced-in lighted area for three baseball fields, an asphalt basketball and handball courts and a children's playground as well as a dog park.

In 1959, residents sought to soften Hell's Kitchen and decided to rename the neighborhood Clinton, after the park. By the 1980s and 1990s, the area around the park had little residential population and it developed a reputation as an outpost for illegal drug use and homeless encampments. In October 1986 three teenagers murdered a homeless man in the park with a kitchen knife.

Various attempts to clean the park included an instance in 1995, when a German company set up a tent for seven months on the lawn for a dinner show production of Pomp Duck and Circumstance.  The company promised to pay $100,000 for improvements to the park. The dinner show was opposed by residents who objected to commercialization of the neighborhood's lone major park (Hell's Kitchen is the jurisdiction of Manhattan Community Board 4 which ranked 57th out of 59 Community Boards for open space in New York City). Following the dinner show, the park was extensively renovated with a new Erie Canal Playground designed around a granite outcropping.  Other changes included new fencing and gates so that the park could be locked at night.  A dog park was added to a converted Bocce court.

Today
In 1998, legislation passed creating the  Hudson River Park across Twelfth Avenue from the park along the Hudson River between 59th Street and Battery Park.  The new park is a joint New York City and New York State park whereas the DeWitt Clinton Park is a city park. Currently, there is no direct connection between the two parks, as the New York Passenger Terminal is built along the entire west side.

In 2005, ENK International Trade Events applied to erect a tent for two weeks in September over the handball and basketball courts in exchange for some minor repairs to the park facilities for a Fashion week event.  After a subcommittee approved it, a storm of protest prompted the Community Board to veto it.

Today, the park hosts sporting events as well, such as the International Quidditch Association's fourth World Cup, which was held in the park on November 13–14, 2010.

Poems

The base of the sculpture bears part of the famous poem, In Flanders Fields,
         If ye break faith with those who died
         We shall not sleep, though poppies grow
        On Flanders fields.

However, this is a misquotation (those, not us; died, not die; and In, not On), of the actual poem by John McCrae,

         Take up our quarrel with the foe
         To you from failing hands we throw
         The torch; be yours to hold it high.
         If ye break faith with us who die
         We shall not sleep, though poppies grow
         In Flanders fields.

See also
 Clinton Park (disambiguation)

References
Notes

External links

 DeWitt Clinton Park at the New York City Department of Parks and Recreation
 DeWitt Clinton Park Conservancy

Parks in Manhattan
Urban agriculture
Dog parks in the United States
Hell's Kitchen, Manhattan
Eleventh Avenue (Manhattan)
West Side Highway